The women's jump competition in water skiing at the 2017 World Games took place from 26 to 27 July 2017 at the Old Odra River in Wrocław, Poland.

Competition format
A total of 9 athletes entered the competition. From qualifications the best 6 skiers qualify to final.

Results

Qualifications

Final

References 

 
2017 World Games